WeatherTech is an American manufacturer of automobile accessories headquartered in Bolingbrook, Illinois.

History

WeatherTech was founded in 1989 by current CEO David MacNeil, who did not appreciate the quality of vehicle floor mats as they did not well-contain dirt and were not easy to clean. At the time, MacNeil was the vice president of sales at high-performance vehicle company AMG, now a subsidiary of Mercedes-Benz. His company began importing accessories made in England and selling them in the United States when in 1994 he found a contract manufacturer and then opened his first plants in the Chicago suburbs.

Products
Among its other products, WeatherTech is primarily known for its FloorLiner brand of heavy-duty rubber floor mats, which it also manufactures for companies such as Volkswagen and Kia. Other products made by the company include other heavy-duty floor mats, trunk liners, windshield sun shades, and mudflaps.

WeatherTech claims over 95% of its products are manufactured in the United States at its plants in Illinois.

Sponsorships

IMSA WeatherTech SportsCar Championship

WeatherTech is the title sponsor of the International Motor Sports Association (IMSA) SportsCar Championship, currently officially known as the IMSA WeatherTech SportsCar Championship through the sponsorship. The sponsorship was announced on August 8, 2015 with the official renaming taking place on November 1 for the 2016 season.

WeatherTech Raceway Laguna Seca

On March 20, 2018, it was announced that the new title sponsor of the Laguna Seca Raceway would be WeatherTech, replacing Mazda. The track was officially renamed to WeatherTech Raceway Laguna Seca soon after on April 1.

References

Companies based in DuPage County, Illinois
American companies established in 1989
Privately held companies based in Illinois
Manufacturing companies based in Illinois
1989 establishments in Illinois